Nocardioides iriomotensis is a Gram-positive, aerobic, non-spore-forming and non-motile bacterium from the genus Nocardioides which has been isolated from forest soil from Okinawa, Japan.

References

External links
Type strain of Nocardioides iriomotensis at BacDive -  the Bacterial Diversity Metadatabase	

iriomotensis
Bacteria described in 2011